= Nicole Cocco =

Dominican powerlifting athlete (born 2002)

Nicole Marie Cocco-Troncoso (b. 2002) is a powerlifting athlete and marketer from the Dominican Republic.

Cocco is the first Dominican woman to compete in a Powerlifting World Championship.

Cocco earned a bachelor's degree in business administration and holds a certification in data science.
